Ukrainian Orienteering Federation is the Ukrainian national  organisation  of orienteering. It is a full member of the International Orienteering Federation.

References

External links
Homepage

International Orienteering Federation members
Orienteering